The Fiordland Trails Trust, New Zealand, was formed in March 2007, and is an Organisation, with Charitable and Donee Status. The Group was set up in response to the need for a recreational cycleway linking the Towns of Manapouri and Te Anau, much of which has high scenic and recreational values. The Trust aims to construct, Fund and Maintain regional multi use trails for the Department of Conservation In the Fiordland and Northern Southland area.

1st press release
The Fiordland Focus ran an article on 4 July 2007 announcing the formation of the Fiordland Trails Trust under the guidance of Diana Zadravec of Venture Southland and Warwick Cambridge of Preston Russell Law.

Conception
The project was initiated by Mike McConachie and Aaron Nicholson, both Motor Camp operators from Manapouri who desired a local walking track to link with the Kepler Track (since 1991). They became a founding members of the Trust Aaron Nicholson is known as an advocate for nature protection and conservation. At the same time Shaun Cantwell a Te Anau teacher from Fiordland College was working to get the community interested in the idea of a local cycle track to the same destination. Venture Southland then decided to call a meeting at the Te Anau Library to bring all parties together.

Current Trustees 2021
Lester Laughton (Chair), Jocelyn Hodges (Secretary), Marilyn Swanson (Treasurer),  Dr Stephen Hoskin, Heather Sinclair, Alistair Burgess, David Boniface, Stephen Martin, Bob Crawford , John Greaney, Chris Carran (Honorary), Aaron Nicholson (Honorary)

Feasibility study
In May 2010 Southern Land CKL of Wanaka put out a 12-page Feasibility study for the 28 km Manapouri–Te Anau Cycleway indicating that an International Standard grade 2 Cycleway would be expected to cost in the region of 1.2 Million.

Trail survey route
Since 2007 the survey line route on the Manapouri end of the Manapouri–Te Anau Cycleway project had been maintained by several local residents making it possible to walk from the Kepler Track exit at Rainbow Reach to the Centre of the Manapouri Township, Via two Famous The Lord of the Rings Movie locations on the Anduin Reach, crossing the Supply Bay Road and following the Manapouri lake shore to Post Office Rock and Fraser's Beach.
However, the Department of Conservation is not involved in the maintenance or administration of this trail.

Ten Years Progress
By 2017 four of the six "Legs" of the trail have been completed from the Department of Conservation Headquarters in Te Anau to the Balloon Loop Road on Highway 95 almost 2 thirds of the way to the township of Manapouri.
The Manapouri to Supply Bay section was completed by 3 June 2018 with Leg 5 through the Fiordland National Park still unable to be released for construction.

See also
 Anduin (Middle-earth)

References

External links
http://www.fantasyfolder.com/news/new–zealand–anduin–reach–naming–effort
http://www.infonews.co.nz/news.cfm?id=16363
http://www.adventuremagazine.co.nz/2008/03/11/fiordland–trails–trust–on–track
http://www.topajka–shaw.co.nz/viv.htm
https://docs.google.com/viewer?a=v&q=cache:tWoIxA8z3ccJ:fiordland.org.nz/Files/DF–Minutes––19–Mar–09.pdf+Te+Anau+board+Cycle+Trail&hl=en&gl=nz&pid=bl&srcid=ADGEEShU6FNs26U8cEcGBIs6hLrLYyv_u94VWWMUuFX7wN7f8302Him0DeIe2Qz7GHQTICoWxIWYhBFv0wzPeyQSzCKk0m93QKWMiojnDiV5ywl6DC8t9IKovNLa8zjoh7QZIIiCqGEO&sig=AHIEtbQA–y1rUJkQflBBE_HPsgTChsW2KQ
https://docs.google.com/viewer?a=v&q=cache:NkV5oF5lKCEJ:www.doc.govt.nz/upload/documents/getting–involved/nz–conservation–authority–and–boards/conservation–boards–by–region/southland/scb–minutes–aug–09.pdf+Te+Anau+board+Cycle+Trail&hl=en&gl=nz&pid=bl&srcid=ADGEESixTESaBlLNczLyzvAcEMc9ezjT4QemL02iFm6WlM2VHw5vtEjPgm2nqvVK59cFjon9WUjESUwJufmECNF0–nGtixcOzxj9RZZLQC0WvWsZtjQmBn7ArprtHdquaP–zexJN3AlG&sig=AHIEtbRaNLVYwJuUcK4CRLqba1GHdMD9SA

External links
 
 
 

Fiordland
Environmental organisations based in New Zealand